Steppin' Out! is the debut album by American saxophonist Harold Vick recorded in 1963 and released on the Blue Note label.

Reception
The Allmusic review by Scott Yanow awarded the album 4½ stars and stated "There are no real surprises, but no disappointments either on what would be Harold Vick's only chance to lead a Blue Note date. At 27 he was already a fine player".

Track listing
All compositions by Harold Vick except where noted
 "Our Miss Brooks" - 7:27
 "Trimmed in Blue" - 6:10
 "Laura" (David Raksin, Johnny Mercer) - 4:39
 "Dotty's Dream" - 6:24
 "Vicksville" - 5:39
 "Steppin' Out" - 5:50
Recorded at Rudy Van Gelder Studio, Englewood Cliffs, New Jersey on May 27, 1963

Personnel
Harold Vick - tenor saxophone
Blue Mitchell - trumpet
John Patton - organ
Grant Green - guitar
Ben Dixon - drums

Charts

References

Blue Note Records albums
Harold Vick albums
1963 albums
Albums recorded at Van Gelder Studio
Albums produced by Alfred Lion